Notarius is a genus of fish in the family Ariidae found in the Atlantic and Pacific Ocean.

Species
There are currently 13 recognized species in this genus:
 Notarius armbrusteri Betancur-R. & Acero P, 2006
 Notarius biffi Betancur-R. & Acero P, 2004
 Notarius bonillai (Miles, 1945) (New Granada sea catfish)
 Notarius cookei (Acero P & Betancur-R., 2002)
 Notarius grandicassis (Valenciennes, 1840) (Thomas sea catfish) 
 Notarius insculptus (D. S. Jordan & C. H. Gilbert, 1883)
 Notarius kessleri (Steindachner, 1876) (Sculptured sea catfish)
 Notarius lentiginosus (C. H. Eigenmann & R. S. Eigenmann, 1888) (Freckled sea catfish)
 Notarius neogranatensis (Acero P & Betancur-R., 2002) (Caribbean sculptured sea catfish)
 Notarius osculus (D. S. Jordan & C. H. Gilbert, 1883) (Chomba sea catfish)
 Notarius parmocassis (Valenciennes, 1840) 
 Notarius planiceps (Steindachner, 1876) (Flat-head sea catfish)
 Notarius troschelii (T. N. Gill, 1863) (Chili sea catfish)

References

Ariidae
Marine fish genera
Taxa named by Theodore Gill
Catfish genera